Milsons Passage is a suburb of Sydney, in the state of New South Wales, Australia. It is located in the Hornsby Shire local government area. According to the 2011 census, the population was 112.

See also
 Dangar Island
 Hawkesbury River Railway Bridge
 Hawkesbury River
 Ku-ring-gai Chase National Park

References

External links 

 

Suburbs of Sydney
Hornsby Shire